Tetyana Yuriivna Melnyk (born 2 April 1995) is a Ukrainian track and field sprinter and hurdler who competes in the 400 metres flat and 400 metres hurdles. She represented her country at the 2016 Summer Olympics. Her personal bests are 51.92 seconds for the 400 m and 57.40 seconds for the 400 m hurdles.

She competed in the hurdles at the 2014 World Junior Championships in Athletics, reaching the semi-finals. She was part of the Ukrainian 4 × 400 metres relay team at the 2016 European Athletics Championships with Yuliya Olishevska, Olha Bibik and Olha Zemlyak. Alina Lohvynenko replaced Olishevska for the Ukrainian Olympic team that took fifth in the relay final.

Personal bests
200 metres – 24.29 (2014)
400 metres – 51.92 (2016)
60 metres hurdles – 8.96 (2013)
400 metres hurdles – 57.40 (2016)
4 × 400 metres relay – 3:24.54 min	(2016)
4 × 400 metres relay indoor – 3:44.60 min (2015)

All information from All-Athletics profile.

International competitions

1Disqualified in the final

References

External links

Living people
1995 births
Ukrainian female sprinters
Ukrainian female hurdlers
Olympic athletes of Ukraine
Athletes (track and field) at the 2016 Summer Olympics
Athletes (track and field) at the 2020 Summer Olympics
Athletes (track and field) at the 2019 European Games
European Games medalists in athletics
European Games gold medalists for Ukraine
Competitors at the 2017 Summer Universiade
Medalists at the 2019 Summer Universiade
Universiade medalists in athletics (track and field)
Universiade gold medalists for Ukraine
Sportspeople from Kirovohrad Oblast
21st-century Ukrainian women